The Hoffnung Music Festivals were a series of three humorous classical music festivals held in Royal Festival Hall, London in 1956, 1958 and 1961 (and a reprise in 1988). They were created by cartoonist and amateur tuba player Gerard Hoffnung.

They included works such as Haydn's Surprise Symphony 'with extra surprises' added by Donald Swann, an 'excerpt from Belshazzar's Feast''', with full orchestra and chorus conducted by William Walton himself (with a fly swat), which turned out to consist of just a single chord with the word "Slain!", and humorous works specially commissioned from well-known composers of the day.

1956 concert
The 1956 concert was recorded, and is available in the American market on Angel Records 35500.  Music from The Hoffnung Music Festival Concert, Royal Festival Hall, London. An Extravagant Evening of Symphonic Caricature devised by Gerald Hoffnung, Producer: Sam Wanamaker, Organizer: John Amis. It was recorded at the concert, 13 November 1956, by EMI and released in the U.S. by Angel Records. The liner notes list the programme:
Introduction by T. E. Bean, General Manager of the Royal Festival Hall
Fanfare by Francis Baines
A Grand Grand Overture by Malcolm Arnold
Concerto for Hose-pipe and Strings (3rd Movement only) by Leopold Mozart played by Dennis Brain
Concerto Popolare (a Piano Concerto to end all Piano Concertos) by Franz Reizenstein
Andante from 'Surprise' Symphony in G major ( B. & H. 94) by Haydn (arr. Donald Leonard Swann)
Gerard Hoffnung introduces Mazurka No. 49 in A minor, Op. 58, No. 2 by Chopin (arr. Daniel Abrams for tuba quartet)
Lochinvar by Humphrey Searle for Speakers and Percussion (words by Sir Walter Scott)
Variations on 'Annie Laurie' by Gordon Jacob:  Tema: Alerto, ma non troppo. Variations: Poco Inglesemente; Molto Zingaresemente; Alla Gigolo; Finale; Assai.

The liner notes were written by John Amis, one of the organizers of the event. He wrote that it was called the Crazy Concert by the London newspapers, and that all 3000-odd seats were sold within two hours of the opening of the box office, breaking all records for Royal Festival Hall at that time.

1958 concert
The 1958 production was the Hoffnung Interplanetary Music Festival, Royal Festival Hall, 21 & 22 November. The conductor for most of the works was Norman Del Mar. The EMI recording for the American market was Angel 35800, released in both mono and stereo. The liner notes list the programme: 
Introductory Music played in the Foyer (Francis Chagrin)
Hoffnung Festival Overture (Francis Baines)
Metamorphosis on a Bed-time Theme (Allegro commerciale in Modo Televisione) (libretto by Alistair Sampson. Music by Joseph Horovitz)
Sugar Plums (realized by Elizabeth Poston) (Dolmetsch Ensemble)
The Famous Tay Whale (a dramatic poem by William McGonagall, music by Mátyás Seiber, declaimed by Edith Evans)
A movement from Concerto for Conductor and Orchestra (Francis Chagrin)
Punkt Contrapunkt ("Bruno Heinz Jaja" alias Humphrey Searle)
Excerpts from The United Nations (Malcolm Arnold)
Waltz for Restricted Orchestra (Peter Racine Fricker)
Let's Fake an Opera or The Tales of Hoffnung (William Mann and Franz Reizenstein).

1961 concert
The 1961 production was the Hoffnung Astronautical Music Festival and was a memorial tribute to Gerard Hoffnung, who had died two years earlier, and was again held in the Royal Festival Hall, 28 November.  It was also recorded by EMI in mono and stereo and released in the U.S. on Angel Records 35828.  The recording was reissued on CD by Hallmark on 20 February 2012.  The selections included 
"Rigmarole" - Introductory Music Played in the Foyer (Francis Baines)
Festival Anthem (Francis Baines)
Overture: Leonora No. 4 by Ludwig van Beethoven (featuring the Happy Wanderers Street Band. The actual arranger was not named, but the work of Malcolm Arnold was unmistakable)
Duet from the Comic Opera "The Barber of Darmstadt" (music by "Bruno Heinz Jaja" alias Humphrey Searle; words by John Amis)
Ballad of County Down, Mostly in D Major (Francis Chagrin)
Excerpt from "Belshazzar's Feast" (conducted by the composer, Sir William Walton)
Horrortorio (music by Joseph Horowitz and words by Alistair Sampson)
Mobile for Seven Orchestras (Lawrence Leonard)

1969 concert
On 17 February 1969, a Hoffnung concert was staged in the Royal Festival Hall in aid of the Notting Hill Housing Trust. It included some of the works from the 1958 festival, and a new work to celebrate Hoffnung, "A Word from Our Founder", by Malcolm Williamson. Conductors included Norman Del Mar and Dudley Moore, with the New Philharmonia Orchestra, and several singers from 1958 returned. Spelling and punctuation are as in the 1969 programme notes:
A Word from Our Founder
Metamorphoses on a Bed-Time Theme, again conducted by the composer
Sugar Plums
Punkt Contra Punkt
Concerto for Conductor and Orchestra (conducted by Dudley Moore)
Let's fake an opera, or, The Tales of Hoffnung
According to the programme, "A two-minute period (at 4.30 am) has been allocated by the Concert Organisers for Community Coughing. If you have a promising cough, please try to save it until then."

1988 concert
On 12 & 13 February 1988 two reprise concerts were performed and recorded at the Royal Festival Hall (released by Decca).  The program, performed by the Philharmonia Orchestra conducted by Tom Bergman, consisted of highlights from previous Hoffnung Festivals, including:
A Hoffnung Festival Fanfare (1956)
A Grand, Grand Overture (1956)
Concerto for Hosepipe & Orchestra (1956)
Ballad of County Down (1961)
The Tay Whale (1958)
Leonora Overture (1961)
Lochinvar (1956)
Concerto Popolare (1956)
Metamorphosis on a Bedtime Theme (1958)
Haydn's Surprise Symphony (1956)

There were also a few new pieces to keep the audience on their toes: Orchestral Switch, Quasimodo e Giulietta, The Heaving Bagpipe, Concerto d'Amore (for two violinists and one violin), and others.  Many distinguished guests appeared, including Donald Swann and Gerard Hoffnung's widow and daughter.

Notes

Sources
  John o'London's Volume 3 (1960)
 Hoffnung, Gerard. The Hoffnung music festival.'' Publisher: Hoffnung Partnership, 2000, 
The Hoffnung Music Festival Concert Recorded at the Royal Festival Hall, London. Angel Records 35500, LP, 1956
The Hoffnung Interplanetary Music Festival, Royal Festival Hall, 21 & 22 November 1958, Angel Records 35800, LP, 1958

Music festivals established in 1956
Classical music festivals in England
Classical music in London
Humor in classical music
1956 in British music
1958 in British music
1961 in British music
1956 in London
1958 in London
1961 in London
Music festivals in London
Comedy festivals in England
1956 music festivals
Royal Festival Hall